Roddy McKenzie (born 31 July 1945) is a former professional footballer, who played as goalkeeper for Airdrieonians, Hibernian and Clydebank.

McKenzie was capped once by Northern Ireland, in a 1966–67 British Home Championship match against Wales. He also played three times for the Northern Ireland under-23 team.

References

External links

1945 births
Living people
Association footballers from Northern Ireland
Association football goalkeepers
Scottish Football League players
Airdrieonians F.C. (1878) players
Hibernian F.C. players
Clydebank F.C. (1965) players
Northern Ireland international footballers
Drumchapel Amateur F.C. players
People from Kilkeel
Expatriate association footballers from Northern Ireland
Expatriate soccer players in Australia
Queensland Lions FC players